Steven Bradley Peters (born November 14, 1962) is an American former Major League Baseball pitcher.

Peters started playing baseball at age 6 with his older brother Kenny, who would later go on to play college baseball at Seminole State College and Pan American. Peters attended Moore High School where in 1981 he was named The Oklahoman's State Player of the Year as a pitcher and outfielder. He began his college career at Seminole before transferring to the University of Oklahoma.

At Oklahoma, he set a school record by winning 14 games in 1985. This record stood until it was tied in 1994 and broken in 1995 by Mark Redman.

One highlight of Peters' brief major league career occurred on October 2, 1987 when he picked up his only save.

References

Sources

Major League Baseball pitchers
St. Louis Cardinals players
Johnson City Cardinals players
St. Petersburg Cardinals players
Springfield Cardinals players
Seminole State Trojans baseball players
Oklahoma Sooners baseball players
Arkansas Travelers players
Louisville Redbirds players
Las Vegas Stars (baseball) players
Oklahoma City 89ers players
Baseball players from Oklahoma
1962 births
Living people
Sportspeople from Oklahoma City
Mat-Su Miners players